Everglades Airpark  is a public-use airport located  southwest of the central business district of the city of Everglades City in Collier County, Florida, United States. The airport is publicly owned.

The airport is also known as the 10,000 islands outpost which hosts seasonal sightseeing tours and banner towing.

References

External links
 

Airports in Florida
Transportation buildings and structures in Collier County, Florida
Everglades City, Florida